Werner Stöckl (born 28 June 1952) is a retired Romanian handball player of Banat Swabian ethnicity. He won the world title in 1974 and two Olympic medals in 1972 and 1976.

Stöckl took up handball in 1967 and in 1969 joined Steaua București, winning with them the EHF Champions League title in 1977. In 1981 he transferred to Carpați Mârșa and helped to promote them from the second to the first division. In 1987 he immigrated with his wife to West Germany, where he played one year for TuS Hofweier upon recommendation from fellow player Simon Schobel. After that he worked as a handball coach.

Awards
 Honorary citizen of the municipality of Reșița (Romania)
 1974: Maestru emerit al sportului (≈ "Outstanding Master of Sports")
 2009: Meritul Sportiv Cl. a II-a (≈ "Sports Award Second Class")

References

External links
 

1952 births
Living people
Romanian male handball players
CSA Steaua București (handball) players
Olympic handball players of Romania
Olympic silver medalists for Romania
Olympic bronze medalists for Romania
Olympic medalists in handball
Medalists at the 1972 Summer Olympics
Medalists at the 1976 Summer Olympics
Handball players at the 1972 Summer Olympics
Handball players at the 1976 Summer Olympics
German people of German-Romanian descent
Sportspeople from Reșița